General elections were held in South Africa on 10 March 1920 to elect the 134 members of the House of Assembly. This was for the third Union Parliament.

The National Party (NP) won the largest number of seats, but not a majority. The South African Party (SAP) minority government continued in office, with Unionist Party support in Parliament. This was the third successive term of SAP government, but only the second period with General Jan Smuts as Prime Minister. The first SAP premier (General Louis Botha) had died in office in 1919, during the previous Parliament.

The National Party became the official opposition for the first time.

Delimitation of electoral divisions
The South Africa Act 1909 had provided for a delimitation commission to define the boundaries for each electoral division. The representation by province, under the third delimitation report of 1919, is set out in the table below. The figures in brackets are the number of electoral divisions in the previous (1913) delimitation. If there is no figure in brackets then the number was unchanged.

Results
The vote totals in the table below may not give a complete picture of the balance of political opinion, because of unopposed elections (where no votes were cast) and because contested seats may not have been fought by a candidate from all major parties.

References
South Africa 1982: Official Yearbook of the Republic of South Africa, published by Chris van Rensburg Publications

General elections in South Africa
South Africa
General
March 1920 events